The 1st Arabian Gulf Cup was the first edition of the Arabian Gulf Cup. The first tournament was held in Bahrain. It was won by the Kuwait, who defeated the hosts in the final match to finish first in the round-robin group. The tournament took place between 27 March and 3 April 1970.

Venues

Match officials

Tournament
The four teams in the tournament played a single round-robin style competition. The team achieving first place in the overall standings was the tournament winner.

All times are local, AST (UTC+3).

Matches

Result

Statistics

Goalscorers

Awards
Player of the Tournament
 Khaled Ballan

Top Scorer
 Mohammed Al-Masoud (3 goals)
 Jawad Khalaf (3 goals)

Goalkeeper of the Tournament
 Ahmed Eid Al-Harbi

References

External links 
 Official Site (Arabic)
RSSSF site

1970
1970
1970 in Asian football
1969–70 in Saudi Arabian football
1969–70 in Bahraini football
1969–70 in Kuwaiti football
1969–70 in Qatari football